Ismael Borrero Molina (born January 6, 1992) is a Greco-Roman wrestler from Cuba. He competed in the 59 kg (or 60 kg) weight category at the 2013, 2014 and 2015 World Championships and won gold medals in 2015 and 2019. Borrero won three consecutive Pan American Championships in 2012–2014 and a gold medal at the 2016 Olympics. 

He represented Cuba at the 2020 Summer Olympics held in Tokyo, Japan. He competed in the 67 kg event.

He is a student at the Universidad de las Ciencias de la Cultura Física y el Deporte in Havana.

References

External links

 
 
 

1992 births
Living people
Cuban male sport wrestlers
World Wrestling Championships medalists
Wrestlers at the 2016 Summer Olympics
Olympic wrestlers of Cuba
Medalists at the 2016 Summer Olympics
Olympic medalists in wrestling
Olympic gold medalists for Cuba
Wrestlers at the 2015 Pan American Games
Central American and Caribbean Games gold medalists for Cuba
Competitors at the 2014 Central American and Caribbean Games
Wrestlers at the 2019 Pan American Games
Pan American Games medalists in wrestling
Pan American Games gold medalists for Cuba
Central American and Caribbean Games medalists in wrestling
Medalists at the 2019 Pan American Games
Pan American Wrestling Championships medalists
Wrestlers at the 2020 Summer Olympics
21st-century Cuban people